Groudle Glen Station  (Manx: Stashoon Raad Yiarn Ghlion Ghroudal) is the first mandatory stopping point and major station on the Manx Electric Railway which serves the village of Groudle Glen in the Isle of Man, and is situated between Groudle Lane and Eskadale on the route to Laxey and Ramsey.

Beginnings

The station was the first terminus of the line in 1893, the following year an extension was opened as far as Laxey and the station became an intermediate one.  The building that still occupies the site, consisting of a large open waiting shelter incorporating ticket office, dates from the beginning of the railway, but has been unmanned for many years.  Despite its somewhat basic appearance and lack of facilities, the station was one of the most popular on the line, serving the glen which operated as pleasure grounds, the adjacent hotel and nearby narrow gauge railway. The hill figure next to it reading "GROUDLE" was placed next to the shelter in a more recent date.

Centenary
The station was considerably refurbished in 1993 for the island's Year Of Railways to mark the centenary of the electric line; at this time, as well as receiving remedial attention to the shelter itself (including paving of the area and repainting, and the addition of old-fashioned advert signs) the surrounding area was also smartened up, with stone walling put in place denoting the station environs, and cast concrete letters being installed in the banking denoting the station name.  A plaque marking the occasion of the centenary was unveiled by the Lieutenant Governor  Sir Laurence Jones and remains in situ today.

Postbox
The station also features a post box, dating from the early part of the 20th century when the Manx Electric Railway held the contract for collection of mail at all stations and halts along its routes.  The contract was lost in 1975 when the railway closed for the winter and could therefore not provide year-round collection facilities.  Despite this, the station retains the post box, which is now cleared by Post Office staff in road vehicles.  This practice continues at the other stopping places on the line, and is one of the distinctive features of even the most basic and remote of the line's stopping places.

Connections
One of the main draws to the area today is that Groudle Glen has its own heritage railway nearby, the Groudle Glen Railway, which was built in 1896 to serve the zoo which had opened 1893 on the outer edge of the glen.  The two-foot gauge line ran intermittently after the Second World War and finally closed in 1962.  It was restored in the 1980s by the Isle of Man Steam Railway Supporters' Association and reopened fully in 1992.  The line now operates each weekend in the summer and for certain other events.  The railway's main station is a short but steep walk from Groudle Glen Station through the glen.

Groudle Glen Hotel

Directly opposite the station is the now closed Groudle Glen Hotel which was built upon the arrival of the railway in 1893 and designed by the renowned architect Baillie Scott.  It operated as a public bar for many years before being sold by the local brewery in 1999 and converted into a restaurant known as "La Casa".  Its remote location ensured that the venture was not entirely successful; however, the new owners did much aesthetic work on the building, restoring stained glass windows, recreating historical signage and completely repainting the building including much of the original detailing such as the "three legs" motifs in the cornice work.

Route

See also
Manx Electric Railway Stations
Groudle Glen Railway
Groudle Glen

References

Sources

 Manx Electric Railway Stopping Places (2002) Manx Electric Railway Society
 Island Images: Manx Electric Railway Pages (2003) Jon Wornham
 Official Tourist Department Page (2009) Isle Of Man Heritage Railways

Railway stations in the Isle of Man
Manx Electric Railway
Groudle Glen Railway
Geoglyphs
Hill figures
Railway stations opened in 1893